The 1931 All-Ireland Junior Hurling Championship was the 14th staging of the All-Ireland Junior Championship since its establishment by the Gaelic Athletic Association in 1912.

Tipperary entered the championship as the defending champions, however, they were beaten by Waterford in the Munster final.

The All-Ireland final was played on 1 November 1931 at Croke Park in Dublin, between Waterford and Lancashire, in what was their first meeting in a final. Waterford won the match by 10-07 to 1-02 to claim their first ever championship title.

Results

All-Ireland Junior Hurling Championship

All-Ireland semi-final

All-Ireland home final

All-Ireland final

Championship statistics

Miscellaneous

 The Leinster final was declared null and void after an objection by Dublin to Kilkenny and a counter objection were both upheld.

References

Junior
All-Ireland Junior Hurling Championship